Aarushi Sharma is an Indian pageant titleholder and actress who typically works in Punjabi-language entertainment. Originally from Himachal Pradesh. Sharma participated in the third edition of Miss Diva - 2015 in 2015 and was selected as a finalist. In 2016, she participated in Senorita India pageant and won the crown of Miss Intercontinental India 2016. She represented India at the Miss Intercontinental 2016 held in Colombo, Sri Lanka. She has featured in several Punjabi music videos since early 2017 such as Aa Chak Challa by Sajjan Adeeb, Ik Vaar by Kanwar Chahal, Hath Chumme by Ammy Virk.

Filmography

Film

Music videos

References

Kaka Ji Movie Songs Information

External links

Femina Miss India
Indian beauty pageant winners
Female models from Delhi
Living people
1996 births
Actresses from Punjab, India
Actresses in Hindi cinema